Opytny is a rural locality (a settlement) in Veydelevsky District, Belgorod Oblast, Russia. The population was 166 as of 2010. There are 5 streets.

Geography 
Opytny is located 6 km southeast of Veydelevka (the district's administrative centre) by road. Viktoropol is the nearest rural locality.

References 

Rural localities in Veydelevsky District